Aavi Kumar is a 2015 Tamil horror comedy film directed by Kandeepan. The film stars Udhaya and Kanika Tiwari in the lead roles while Nassar, Jagan and Manobala among others form an ensemble cast. This movie is an unofficial remake of Mohanlal starrer Vismayathumbathu (2004). Music for the film was composed by Vijay Antony and Srikanth Deva and the film opened to negative reviews in July 2015.

Cast

 Udhaya as Kumar 
 Kanika Tiwari as Abhirami
 Nassar as Mahendran
 Jagan as Kumar's friend
 Manobala as Doctor 
 M. S. Bhaskar as Kumar's uncle
 Ramdoss as patient 
 Devadarshini as patient's wife
 Shruti Reddy as Shruti
 Bava Lakshmanan as broker
 Vijayaganesh
 Hafsal
 Sharfuddin Shah
 Punitha Shanmugam
 Agnes Sounkar
 Madhu Tiwari
 'Saivam' Vicky
 Varusai Kubendran

Production
Choreographer Chinni Prakash recommended that the team sign on Kanika Tiwari for the lead role, after she had made her acting debut in the Hindi film, Agneepath (2012) as Hrithik Roshan's sister. Vijay Antony was signed on as music composer, and suggested the title for the film. His busy schedules meant that Srikanth Deva was later brought in to finish the film's score and soundtrack. Shooting for the film began in Malaysia during December 2012, with a first loom poster released on the day. The film progressed throughout April 2013, with Udhaya balancing his shoot alongside his commitments as an actor in his brother's film, Thalaivaa (2013). The team shot in Malaysia for 45 days, before returning to Chennai finish portions.

The film struggled to find a distributor and initially, the makers considered giving the film to Cheran's newly launched C2H network to provide a straight-to-DVD release, but eventually opted against doing so.

Soundtrack
The music composed by Vijay Antony and Srikanth Deva.

Release
The film opened in July 2015 to mixed reviews from critics. A reviewer from the Deccan Chronicle noted "the plot is new and interesting", while the "film had all the potential to turn out to be an engaging thriller, had the director infused some twists and turns instead of narrating it flat". Likewise, the critic from the Times of India noted "in the right hands, this could have been an engaging mystery that thrilled us with every revelation", but "what we get is a tonally deaf film which goes about narrating the plot points in a bland and clichéd fashion". A further reviewer from Nowrunning.com suggested that "Aavikumar is a wannabe horror comedy film which is neither frightening nor entertaining".

References

2015 films
2010s Tamil-language films
2015 comedy horror films
Indian comedy horror films
Films scored by Vijay Antony
Films scored by Srikanth Deva
Tamil remakes of Malayalam films